The White & Thompson Bognor Bloater was a British First World War two-seat reconnaissance biplane. It was designed and built by White & Thompson Limited of Middleton-on-Sea, near Bognor Regis, Sussex for the Admiralty as a competitor to the Royal Aircraft Factory BE.2. Designated N.T.3 by White & Thompson, it is not known if there was an official designation for the aircraft, which was known in service with the nickname Bognor Bloater.

Design and development
The Bloater was a conventional unequal-span tractor biplane with a monocoque fuselage and powered by a 70 hp (52 kW) Renault engine. Twelve were ordered but only ten were delivered, the other two retained for spares. The Bloater nickname came from the unusual copper-sewn cedar monocoque fuselage built by S.E Saunders (later Saunders-Roe) the first production aircraft to use the monocoque technique.

The prototype was first flown on 8 March 1915 at Bognor by Gordon England.

Operational history
The Bloaters entered service with the Royal Naval Air Service in 1915 and had only limited service in communications and training roles but mainly on coastal patrols from the air stations at Eastbourne, Great Yarmouth and Killingholme.

Operators

Royal Naval Air Service

Specifications

See also

Notes

References

External links

List of aircraft utilised by the RFC, RNAS, RAF and US Navy within the UK 1912-1918

1910s British military reconnaissance aircraft
Bognor Bloater
Single-engined tractor aircraft
Biplanes
Aircraft first flown in 1915